Renny Quow (born 25 August 1987) is a Trinidadian male track and field sprinter who specializes in the 400 metres and has made it to both the Olympic and World Finals in the event, a rare feat for athletes from the Caribbean in the 400m.  He competes professionally for Adidas. He was born in Tobago. Quow remains the only quarter miler from Trinidad & Tobago to make it to every major 400m finals (Olympics/Worlds/World Jrs/CAC/CARIFTA/Commonwealth Games).

Quow attended South Plains College in Levelland, Texas before turning Professional, becoming the most successful quarter miler in the college's history. His personal best time is 44.53 seconds, achieved at the 2009 World Championships in Athletics in Berlin. Renny Quow has medalled in every major junior/senior championships outside the Olympic Games making him the most decorated 400m runner to come out of Trinidad & Tobago.

Achievements

References

External links

Renny Quow strikes bronze for Trinidad and Tobago

1987 births
Living people
Trinidad and Tobago male sprinters
Olympic athletes of Trinidad and Tobago
Athletes (track and field) at the 2008 Summer Olympics
World Athletics Championships medalists
Recipients of the Hummingbird Medal
Athletes (track and field) at the 2014 Commonwealth Games
Athletes (track and field) at the 2018 Commonwealth Games
Athletes (track and field) at the 2015 Pan American Games
World Athletics Championships athletes for Trinidad and Tobago
Pan American Games medalists in athletics (track and field)
Commonwealth Games medallists in athletics
Commonwealth Games bronze medallists for Trinidad and Tobago
Pan American Games gold medalists for Trinidad and Tobago
Sportspeople from Port of Spain
Central American and Caribbean Games silver medalists for Trinidad and Tobago
Competitors at the 2006 Central American and Caribbean Games
World Athletics Indoor Championships medalists
World Athletics Championships winners
Central American and Caribbean Games medalists in athletics
Medalists at the 2015 Pan American Games
Junior college men's track and field athletes in the United States
South Plains College alumni
Medallists at the 2014 Commonwealth Games